Bennigan may refer to:

Bennigan's, an Irish pub-themed American casual dining restaurant chain 
Claire Bennigan, character in The Whispers (TV series)
Drew Bennigan, character in The Whispers (TV series)
Sean Bennigan, character in The Whispers (TV series)